Octavio Juan Díaz (7 October 1900 – 12 November 1977) was an Argentine Association football goalkeeper who played for the Argentina national football team.

Díaz played club football for Rosario Central, where he won a few local titles and a national cup in 1920. He represented Argentina on 9 occasions between 1926 and 1928. He was a member of the Argentine team, which won the 1927 South American Championship and the silver medal in the 1928 Olympic football tournament.

References

External links

Sports profile

1900 births
1973 deaths
Argentine footballers
Club Atlético Atlanta footballers
Footballers at the 1928 Summer Olympics
Olympic footballers of Argentina
Olympic silver medalists for Argentina
Argentina international footballers
Olympic medalists in football
Medalists at the 1928 Summer Olympics
Association football goalkeepers